The A74 motorway is a short motorway in the Netherlands. It connects the A73 in Venlo to the German border, where it becomes the German A 61. This makes it an important link for international traffic from around Venlo to Germany. The A74 is 1.893 kilometers in length.

Exit list

References

Motorways in the Netherlands
Motorways in Limburg (Netherlands)
Transport in Venlo